OSK3, from the venom of the scorpion Orthochirus scrobiculosus, is a potassium channel blocker that belongs to the α-KTx8 subfamily and targets the voltage-gated potassium channels KCNA2 (Kv1.2), and KCNA3 (Kv1.3).

Etymology and source

OSK3 is secreted from the venom gland of Orthochirus scrobiculosus, which is also known as the Central Asian scorpion and belongs to the Buthoidea superfamily, the largest scorpion superfamily. The toxin gets its name from the acronym of the species it originates from, the type of ion channel it blocks, and the order of its discovery within the toxin family.

Chemistry

Structure

The propeptide of OSK3 is a small polypeptide consisting of 57 amino acids, with a mean molecular mass of 6386 Da. It is then further spliced into a mature form consisting of 29 amino acid residues, among which 6 are cysteine residues that make up 3 intracellular disulfide bonds. The mean mass of the OSK3 toxin is 3206.3 ± 0.2 Da. 
 
Sequence of OSK3 propeptide:

Family

OSK3 (α-KTx 8.8) belongs to the α-KTx family, which is a scorpion venom toxin family blocking potassium channels. It is the most abundant and shows the highest diversity among the six KTx families (α-,β-,γ-,δ-,κ-, and λ-KTx). Additionally, OSK3 is the eighth member of the α-KTx8 subfamily. The preceding members are AmP01 (α-KTx 8.1), BmP01 (α-KTx 8.2), LpII (α-KTx 8.3), LPIII (α-KTx 8.4), OdK1 (α-KTx 8.5), MeuKTx-1 (α-KTx 8.6), and MeKTx1-2 (α-KTx 8.7).

Homology

All members of the α-KTx8 subfamily consist of 29 amino acid residues. 97% of the residues in OSK3 are identical with AmP01 (α-KTx8.1) which originates from the scorpion Androctonus mauretanicus mauretanicus, with only one differing amino acid residue. OSK3 differs from OdK1, α-KTx8.5, with only two C-terminal residues. Due to this structural difference, specific interactions of the residues with the type of voltage gated potassium channels also vary; OdK1 targets Kv1.2 whereas OSK3 inhibits both Kv1.2 and Kv1.3 channels.

Target

OSK3 displays a novel selectivity profile as compared to the rest of the α-KTx8 subfamily, targeting selectively the voltage-gated potassium channels Kv1.2 and Kv1.3. At 1 μM, it blocks Kv1.2 channels completely and Kv1.3 channels by 88 ± 4%. At the same concentration, OSK3 also inhibits Kv1.6 by 11 ± 3%. The IC50 values for Kv1.2, Kv1.3 and Kv1.6 are 331 ± 17 nM, 503 ± 31nM, and 9983 ± 172 nM respectively. Higher activity levels on the aforementioned channels has been observed in other well-studied toxins, however this activity level is typical for members of the subfamily such as AmP01 (α-KTx 8.1) and OdK1 (α-KTx 8.5).

Mode of action

OSK3 selectively blocks Kv1.2 and Kv1.3. The underlying mechanism for the high affinity of OSK3 for these channels depends on the non-specific hydrophobic interactions between the C-terminal residues of OSK3 and the channel proteins, contrary to many other highly selective ligand-receptor complexes which mostly depend on specific contacts such as hydrogen bonds and salt bridges. It is suggested that toxins of the α-KTx8 family specifically bind to the potassium channel vestibule.

References 

Ion channel toxins
Scorpion toxins